Inkino is a rural locality (a selo) in Kabansky District, Republic of Buryatia, Russia. The population was 93 as of 2010. There are 2 streets.

Geography 
Inkino is located 54 km northeast of Kabansk (the district's administrative centre) by road. Dubinino is the nearest rural locality.

References 

Rural localities in Kabansky District